The Secretary at War was a political position in the English and later British government, with some responsibility over the administration and organization of the Army, but not over military policy. The Secretary at War ran the War Office. After 1794 it was occasionally a Cabinet-level position, although it was considered of subordinate rank to the Secretaries of State. The position was combined with that of Secretary of State for War in 1854 and abolished in 1863.

Notable holders of the position include Robert Walpole, the Hon. Henry Pelham, Henry Fox, Lord Palmerston and Lord Macaulay.

Secretaries at War, 1661–1854

Secretaries of State for War and Secretaries at War, 1854–1863

References

War
Defunct ministerial offices in the United Kingdom
History of the British Army
War Office
1661 establishments in England